The Trees Are Dead & Dried Out Wait for Something Wild is the debut album by British progressive metal band Sikth, released on 18 August 2003 by Unparalleled Records. The album was produced by the band and Andrew Scarth.

Background
Sikth was formed in 1999 by vocalists Tristan Lucey and Mikee Goodman along with Dan Weller, Graham 'Pin' Pinney, and Jamie Hunter. The band's lineup would be cemented in 2001 with the addition of Justin Hill, James Leach, and Dan 'Loord' Foord; Lucey and Hunter would depart from the band around the same time.

The band released its first EP, Let the Transmitting Begin, in early 2002 through Infernal Records. The initial release featured the songs "Such the Fool", "If You Weren't So Perfect", and "Hold My Finger"; all three songs would be re-recorded for The Trees Are Dead & Dried Out. Shortly after the EP's release, Sikth was signed to Unparalleled Carousel/Gut Records, who would release the band's second EP How May I Help You? on 23 September 2002. How May I Help You? featured the title track, "Suffice", and a cover of "Tupelo", originally by Nick Cave and the Bad Seeds.

Release
The Trees Are Dead & Dried Out Wait for Something Wild was initially released on 18 August 2003 through Unparalleled Carousel in the UK. The album's first single, "Scent of the Obscene", was released on 27 October 2003 and featured a cover of the Iron Maiden song "Wrathchild" as its b-side. Second single, "Peep Show", was released in December 2003.

Track listing

Personnel
Sikth
Dan Weller – guitar, piano
Graham "Pin" Pinney – guitar
James Leach – bass
Mikee W. Goodman – vocals, lyrics, synthesizer
Justin Hill – vocals
Dan "Loord" Foord – drums, percussion

Other personnel
Andrew Scarth – audio engineering
Colin Richardson – mixing
Paul Hoare and Jakob Nygard – additional mixing
Vlado Meller – mastering
Dick Beetham – additional mastering, editing and compiling
Paul Chessell – art direction and design
Jana Leon and Patrick Ryan – photography

References

Sikth albums
2003 debut albums
Gut Records albums
Albums produced by Dan Weller